Bryn Mawr College is a women's liberal arts college in Bryn Mawr, Pennsylvania.  Founded as a Quaker institution in 1885, Bryn Mawr is one of the Seven Sister colleges, a group of elite, historically women's colleges in the United States, and the Tri-College Consortium along with Haverford College and Swarthmore College. Finally, it is one of 15 Quaker colleges in the United States. The college has an enrollment of about 1,350 undergraduate students and 450 graduate students. It was the first women's college to offer graduate education through a PhD.

History 
Bryn Mawr College is a private women's liberal arts college founded in 1885. The phrase  literally means 'large hill' in Welsh. The Graduate School is co-educational. It is named after the town of Bryn Mawr, in which the campus is located, which had been renamed by a representative of the Pennsylvania Railroad. Bryn Mawr was the name of an area estate granted to Rowland Ellis by William Penn in the 1680s. Ellis's former home, also called Bryn Mawr, was a house near Dolgellau, Merioneth, Gwynedd, Wales. The college was largely founded through the bequest of Joseph W. Taylor, and its first president was James Rhoads. Bryn Mawr was one of the first institutions of higher education in the United States to offer graduate degrees, including doctorates, to women. The first class included 36 undergraduate women and eight graduate students. Bryn Mawr was originally affiliated with the Quakers (Religious Society of Friends), but by 1893 had become non-denominational.

In 1912, Bryn Mawr became the first college in the United States to offer doctorates in social work, through the Department of Social Economy and Social Research. This department became the Graduate School of Social Work and Social Research in 1970. In 1931, Bryn Mawr began accepting men as graduate students, while remaining women-only at the undergraduate level.

From 1921 to 1938 the Bryn Mawr campus was home to the Bryn Mawr Summer School for Women Workers in Industry, which was founded as part of the labor education movement and the women's labor movement.  The school taught women workers political economy, science, and literature, as well as organizing many extracurricular activities.

The college celebrated its 125th anniversary of "bold vision, for women, for the world" during the 2010–2011 academic year. In September 2010, Bryn Mawr hosted an international conference on issues of educational access, equity, and opportunity in secondary schools and universities in the United States and around the world. Other festivities held for the anniversary year included publication of a commemorative book on 125 years of student life, and, in partnership with the Philadelphia Mural Arts Program, creation of a mural in West Philadelphia highlighting advances in women's education.

On February 9, 2015, the Board of Trustees announced approval of a working group recommendation to expand the undergraduate applicant pool. Transgender women and intersex individuals identifying as women may now apply for admission, while transgender men identifying as such at time of application may not. This official decision made Bryn Mawr the fourth women's college in the United States to accept trans women.

On November 19, 2020, a 16-day student strike for social justice and against racism organized by the Bryn Mawr Strike Collective came to an end. President Kim Cassidy accepted the areas that need action as demanded by the Collective and committed herself and the institution to fight for anti-racism.

Presidents 
 1885–1894 James Rhoads
 1894–1922 M. Carey Thomas
 1922–1942 Marion Edwards Park
 1942–1970 Katharine Elizabeth McBride
 1970–1978 Harris Wofford
 1978–1997 Mary Patterson McPherson
 1997–2008 Nancy J. Vickers
 2008–2013 Jane Dammen McAuliffe
 2013–present Kimberly Wright Cassidy

Campus 

The campus is in the municipality of Lower Merion Township. Most of the campus is in the Bryn Mawr census-designated place.

The campus was designed in part by noted landscape designers Calvert Vaux and Frederick Law Olmsted, and has subsequently been designated an arboretum (the Bryn Mawr Campus Arboretum). Bryn Mawr has frequently been listed as one of the most beautiful college campuses in the United States .

Student residences 
The majority of Bryn Mawr students live on campus in residence halls. Many of the older residence halls were designed by Cope & Stewardson (same architects who designed a large part of Washington University in St. Louis and Princeton University) and are known for their Collegiate Gothic architecture, modeled after Cambridge University. Each is named after a county town in Wales: Brecon, Denbigh (1891), Merion (1885), and Radnor (1887), and Pembroke East and West (1892). Rhoads North and South was named after the college's first president, James E. Rhoads; Rockefeller is named after its donor, John D. Rockefeller. Erdman was opened in 1965, designed by architect Louis Kahn. In addition, students may choose to live in Batten House (an environmentally friendly co-op). Perry House, which was originally established as the Spanish language house in 1962, was redefined as the Black Cultural Center in the 1970s. In 2015, Perry House was relaunched by the college in the former French tower of Haffner, which had undergone renovations and reconstruction the previous year. Along with Perry, now known as the Enid Cook '31 Center, a new residence hall was built where the old Haffner Language and Culture House once stood.

Glenmede (formerly graduate student housing) is an estate located about a half mile from the main campus which at one point was available housing for undergraduate students. In 2007, it was sold to a conservation buyer as the annual costs of upkeep were too great for the college.

Libraries 
Bryn Mawr's library holdings are housed in the Mariam Coffin Canaday Library (opened 1970), the Rhys Carpenter Library (opened 1997), and the Lois and Reginald Collier Science Library (opened 1993). TRIPOD, the online library catalog, automatically accesses holdings at Haverford and Swarthmore.

Blanca Noel Taft Memorial Garden 
In 1908, John C. Olmsted designed a private garden for M. Carey Thomas adjoining the Deanery. The garden was later modified and renamed as the Blanca Noel Taft Memorial Garden. In its current form, the garden is a small, serene enclosure with two wall fountains, one with a small basin and the other with a sunken reflecting pool. The decorative wall tiles above the smaller wall fountain and basin were purchased from Syria.

Erdman Hall dormitory 

In 1960, architect Louis I. Kahn and Bryn Mawr College president, Katharine Elizabeth McBride, came together to create the Erdman Hall dormitory.

For over a year, Kahn and his assistants struggled to translate the college's design program of 130 student rooms and public spaces into a scheme (well documented by the letters written between McBride and Kahn).  The building comprises three geometrical square structures, connected at their corners. The outer walls are formed by interlocking student rooms around three inner public spaces: the entry hall, dining hall and living hall. These spaces receive light from towering light monitors.

Marjorie Walter Goodhart Theater 

The Marjorie Walter Goodhart Theater houses a vaulted auditorium designed by Arthur Ingersoll Meigs of Mellor, Meigs & Howe, two smaller spaces that are ideal for intimate performances by visiting artists, practice rooms for student musicians, and the Office for the Arts.  The building's towers and gables, friezes, carvings and ornamental ironwork, designed by Samuel Yellin, were done in the gothic revival style.  In the fall of 2009, the college completed a $19 million renovation of Goodhart, which included expanded stage and rehearsal space, updated sound and lighting, a teaching theater, and renovated seating for audiences.

Old Library (previously M. Carey Thomas Library and College Hall) 

Previously named after Bryn Mawr's first Dean and second president, Old Library was used as the primary campus library until 1970, when Mariam Coffin Canaday Library opened. The Great Hall (formerly the reading room of the library) was designed by Walter Cope (of Cope and Stewardson) in 1901 and built by Stewardson and Jamieson several years later, although M. Carey Thomas played a large part in its construction. Today, it is a space for performances, readings, lectures, and public gatherings. Old Library encloses a large open courtyard called "The Cloisters", which is the site of the college's traditional Lantern Night ceremony.  The cremated remains of M. Carey Thomas and Emmy Noether are located in the Cloisters. Georgiana Goddard King is also buried in the cloister. The building was declared a National Historic Landmark in 1991. The Great Hall was once the home of an Athena Lemnia statue (damaged in 1997) that is now located in a high alcove in the Rhys Carpenter Art and Archaeology Library. A plaster cast of that Athena now stands in her place at the Great Hall. Students often leave offerings to this statue in the hope that she will intervene on their behalf during testing and other trying circumstances. In 2018, the Board of Trustees formalized the use of the name "The Old Library."

Old Library was formerly known as "Thomas Hall" after Bryn Mawr's second president, M. Carey Thomas. The building was informally known as "College Hall" for a year before being officially renamed to "Old Library" in 2018. This renaming was in response to student protests, which claimed that many of M. Carey Thomas's views did not represent the values of the college. Student protesters identified that M. Carey Thomas was a virulent eugenicist, antisemite and racist who strongly opposed the admission of students who were not elite white women. Today, the building houses a plaque explaining the controversy of the former name and affirming the college's current dedication to equity and inclusion, which was unveiled during the 2019 Community Day of Learning.

Rhys Carpenter Art and Archaeology Library 

Named for Bryn Mawr's late professor of Classical Archaeology, the Rhys Carpenter Library was designed by Henry Myerberg of New York and opened in 1997.  The space is connected to the rear of the M. Carey Thomas Library. The entrance is a four-story atrium. Names of art and archaeology faculty are displayed on the main wall of the atrium, along with a series of plaster casts of the metopes of the Parthenon.  Most of the stacks, study areas, lecture halls and seminar rooms are located underground.  The roof comprises a wide grassy area used for outdoor concerts and picnics.  The building won a 2001 Award of Excellence for Library Architecture from the Library Administration and Management Association and the American Institute of Architects. Carpenter Library also houses the college's renowned collections in Classical and Near Eastern Archaeology, History of Art, and Classics. The building also contains a large lecture hall and several seminar rooms.

The Deanery 

The Bryn Mawr College Deanery was the campus residence of the first Dean and second President of Bryn Mawr College, M. Carey Thomas, who maintained a home there from 1885 to 1933. Under the direction of Thomas, the Deanery was gradually enlarged and elaborately decorated with the assistance of the American artist Lockwood de Forest and furnished with art from Thomas' world travels. From 1933 until 1968, the Deanery served as the Alumnae Center and Inn for the college. The building was demolished in the spring of 1968 to make space for the construction of Canaday Library, which stands on the site today. At the time of its demolition, many of the Deanery's furnishings were re-located to Wyndham, an 18th-century farmhouse (with several modern additions) which became the college's new Alumnae Center.

Organization 
Bryn Mawr undergraduates largely govern themselves in academic and social matters via the Self-Government Association. A significant aspect of self-government is the Academic Honor System (honor code). The Honor Code is a set of principles that stress mutual respect and academic integrity. Students ratify the code each year, agree to adhere to it, and enforce its provisions.

Along with Haverford College, Bryn Mawr forms the Bi-College Community. Students in the "Bi-Co" enjoy unlimited cross-registration privileges and may choose to major or live in the dorms at the other institution. The two institutions join with Swarthmore College to form the Tri-College Consortium, opening the Swarthmore course catalog to interested Bryn Mawr students as well. Free shuttles are provided between the three campuses. There is the Blue Bus between Bryn Mawr and Haverford College, and a van, known to the students as the "Swat Van", that travels among the three colleges.

In addition, the college is affiliated with the University of Pennsylvania through a special association known as the Quaker Consortium, allowing Bryn Mawr students to take classes there. Additionally, Bryn Mawr students in the Growth and Structure of Cities department may earn a Bachelor of Arts at Bryn Mawr and a master's degree in city planning at Penn through the 3–2 Program in City and Regional Planning. Students also are allowed to take classes related to their major at the nearby Villanova University through a specific registration process.

Academics 

Bryn Mawr is a small, four year, residential baccalaureate college. Although the college offers several graduate programs, the majority of enrollments are from students enrolled in the undergraduate arts and sciences program.

Students at Bryn Mawr are required to complete divisional requirements in the social sciences, natural sciences (including lab skills) and humanities. In addition, they must complete one year of a foreign language and fulfill a quantitative skills requirement and an Emily Balch Seminar requirement. The Emily Balch Seminars are similar to courses in freshman composition at other institutions, though focus on a specific topic. The seminars stress development of critical thinking skills and are discussion-based, with "intensive reading and writing."

Its most popular undergraduate majors, based on 2021 graduates, were:
English Language and Literature (31)
Biology/Biological Sciences (27)
Psychology (24)
Mathematics (23)
Computer Science (22)

Admissions

Admission to Bryn Mawr is classified as "more selective, lower transfer in."  For the Class of 2023 (enrolling fall 2019), Bryn Mawr received 3,332 applications, admitted 1,102 (33.1%), and enrolled 374 students. For the freshmen who enrolled, the middle 50% range of SAT scores was 640-740 for evidence-based reading and writing, and 650-770 for math, while the middle 50% ACT composite score range was 29–33.

Traditions 

The four major traditions held at Bryn Mawr College include Parade Night, which traditionally took place on the first day of classes each academic year, but has been moved to the Friday of the first week of classes; Lantern Night, which takes place in late October or early November; Welcome the First Years Week (previously known as Hell Week), which takes place in mid-February; and May Day, which takes place on the Sunday after classes end in the spring semester. The Dar Williams song "As Cool As I Am" has recently become part of the tradition of May Day; it is played during the "May Hole" celebration, which is the feminist answer to the traditional maypoles displayed on campus. In the bi-campus newspaper shared with Haverford College, one student called it the college's unofficial anthem.

Bryn Mawr students gather quarterly for "Step Sings," or evenings spent outside Taylor Hall, singing hymns, traditional feminist songs and contemporary songs. Step Sings follow each major tradition, except WTF Week.

Two Traditions heads, elected by the student body, are in charge of organizing and running traditions.

In addition to events, Bryn Mawr's traditions extend to superstitions around the campus, some of which date back to the opening of the college in 1885. Many of these superstitions involve not being able to graduate, and can be rectified by leaving an offering at the statue of Athena in the Great Hall.

Sustainability 
Bryn Mawr has signed the American College and University President's Climate Commitment, and in doing so, the school agreed to make all new buildings comply with a LEED silver standard or higher; to purchase Energy Star products whenever possible; and to provide and encourage the use of public transportation. The school's dining halls strive to be environmentally sustainable by working to expand their local and organic offerings, recycling in all dining areas, and recycling used fry oil as bio-diesel fuel. The dining halls previously offered biodegradable takeout containers, but reverted to Styrofoam in the 2009/10 academic year. Additionally, all leftover food is donated to a local food bank. On the College Sustainability Report Card 2011, published by the Sustainable Endowments Institute, Bryn Mawr received a B+. The school's highest category score was an A in Investment Priorities, since Bryn Mawr invests in renewable energy funds.

Athletics 
Bryn Mawr fields intercollegiate teams in badminton, basketball, cross country, fencing, field hockey, lacrosse, rowing, rugby, soccer, swimming, tennis, track and field, and volleyball.  The badminton team won national intercollegiate championships in 1996 and 2008.  The mascot of the college is the owl, the symbol of Athena, Greek goddess of wisdom.

Notable alumnae and faculty

Alumnae

A large number of Bryn Mawr alumnae and former attendees are notable in their respective fields. The list includes Drew Gilpin Faust (class of 1968), the first woman president of Harvard University; Hanna Holborn Gray (1950), the first woman president of a major research university (University of Chicago); modernist poets Hilda "H.D." Doolittle (attended), and Marianne Moore (1909); classics scholar Edith Hamilton (M.A. 1894); author, social activist and feminist Grace Lee Boggs (Ph.D. 1940); Nobel Peace Prize winner Emily Greene Balch (1889); geneticist Nettie Stevens (Ph.D. 1903); physicist Elizabeth Laird (Ph.D. 1901); physicist and astronomer Frances Lowater (Ph.D. 1904); mathematician Ada Isabel Maddison (Ph.D. 1896); Physician Martha Tracy (1898) a pioneer in medical education and in public health; 1891 Fellow in Mathematics Ruth Gentry; artist Anne Truitt (1943); author Ellen Kushner (attended); economist and founding Director of the Congressional Budget Office Alice Rivlin (1952); four-time Academy Award-winning actress Katharine Hepburn (1928); novelist and poet Ellis Avery (1993); novelist Andrea Portes (1993); poet Jane Hess Flanders (1962); Jo Ellen Johnson Parker (B.A., 1975), the 10th president of Sweet Briar College; Hadley Richardson (attended), first wife of Ernest Hemingway; Martha Gellhorn, (attended) journalist, and third wife of Ernest Hemingway; Julia Fahl, mayor of Lambertville, New Jersey; Agnes E. Wells, women's equal rights movement activist and dean of women at Indiana University; Carol Alonso, nuclear physicist; Mary Elizabeth Taylor, former aide to Senate Majority Leader Mitch McConnell and Forbes 30 under 30; Carolyn Goodman, mayor of Las Vegas from 2011-; Betsy Hodges, mayor of Minneapolis from 2013 to 2017; Renata Adler, novelist and journalist; Dame A.S. Byatt, novelist and Booker Prize winner; Joan Slonczewski, biologist and science fiction novelist; Caroline Stevermer, fantasy novelist; Rachel Simon, author and memoirist; Maggie Siff, actor (1996). Neuroscientist Candace Pert (1970) helped discover opioid receptors. Ana Botín is chair of the Santander Group, one of the world's largest banking groups. Indie musician Michelle Zauner (who performs as Japanese Breakfast) attended Bryn Mawr as well. The social reformer, Alice P. Gannett (1898), for whom the Goodrich-Gannett Neighborhood Center is named, attended Bryn Mawr, as did Maya Ajmera, CEO of Society for Science & the Public. Jeannette Piccard, American balloonist, scientist, teacher and priest.

Faculty
Notable faculty include Woodrow Wilson, chemists Arthur C. Cope and Louis Fieser, Arthur Lindo Patterson of the Patterson function, Edmund Beecher Wilson, philologists Catherine Conybeare, Grace Frank and Louise Holland, archaeologists Brunilde Sismondo Ridgway, Leicester Bodine Holland, Thomas Hunt Morgan, historian Caroline Robbins, Emmy Noether and Lillian Rosanoff Lieber, Richmond Lattimore, Tenney Frank, Mabel Louise Lang, and Lily Ross Taylor, French literature professor and decorated French Resistance officer Marcelle Pardé, the Spanish philosopher José Ferrater Mora, Germanic philologist Agathe Lasch, Classical philologist Wilmer Cave Wright, Hispanist and medievalist Georgiana Goddard King, poet Karl Kirchwey, and historian and author Amy Kelly.

Notes

References

Further reading 
Horowitz, Helen Lefkowitz. The Power and Passion of M. Carey Thomas. New York: Knopf, 1994.
Horowitz, Helen Lefkowitz. Alma Mater: design and experience in the women's colleges from their nineteenth-century beginnings to the 1930s; 2nd ed. Amherst: University of Massachusetts Press, 1993.

External links 

 
 The Bi-College News, Bryn Mawr and Haverford Colleges' Student Newspaper

 
Eastern Pennsylvania Rugby Union
Educational institutions established in 1885
Gothic Revival architecture in Pennsylvania
Liberal arts colleges in Pennsylvania
Lower Merion Township, Pennsylvania
School buildings on the National Register of Historic Places in Pennsylvania
Seven Sister Colleges
Universities and colleges in Montgomery County, Pennsylvania
1885 establishments in Pennsylvania
Historic districts on the National Register of Historic Places in Pennsylvania
National Register of Historic Places in Montgomery County, Pennsylvania
Quaker universities and colleges
Private universities and colleges in Pennsylvania